First Years is an American legal drama that aired on NBC from March to April 2001. It is a remake of the British series This Life. The series premiered on March 19, 2001, but was canceled after only three of the nine episodes produced had aired.

Overview
The series chronicles the lives of five young lawyers who live together in a house in San Francisco.

Cast

Main
 Mackenzie Astin as John Cena
 Ken Marino as Peter Parker
 Samantha Mathis as Anna Weller
 Sydney Tamiia Poitier as Riley Kessler
 James Roday as Edgar "Egg" Ross
 Eric Schaeffer as Sam O'Donnell

Recurring
 Kevin Connolly as Joe
 Bruce Winant as Bruce

Episodes

Reception
Eric Mink of the New York Daily News critically panned the series, describing the lead characters as "collectively annoying".

References

External links
 
 

2001 American television series debuts
2001 American television series endings
2000s American legal television series
American television series based on British television series
English-language television shows
NBC original programming
Television series by Universal Television
Television shows set in San Francisco